Halobates princeps is a species of water strider within the family Gerridae. It has a distribution covering parts of the Indian and Pacific Ocean near areas such as India, Australia, Indonesia, Papua New Guinea, Malaysia and the Philippines.

References 

Insects described in 1883
Halobatinae
Marine fauna of Oceania
Invertebrates of the Indian Ocean
Fauna of the Pacific Ocean